Ganga Sagar may refer to:
 Ganga Sagar (film), a 1978 Bollywood film
 Ganga Sagar (urn), a sacred Sikh relic
 Sagar Island, an island in the Ganges Delta